Joseph T. Edgar (April 1, 1910 – November 27, 1990) was an American politician from Maine. Edgar, a Republican from Bar Harbor, was first elected to the Maine House of Representatives in 1954.

After serving his first term outside leadership Edgar was elected Speaker of the Maine House of Representatives. He served two terms as Speaker before leaving leadership. Re-elected in 1960, Edgar resigned in June 1961 and was replaced by John B. Ellis. In 1967, he was elected by the Maine Legislature as Secretary of State. He retired from that office in 1974 and was replaced by Democrat Markham L. Gartley.

References

1910 births
1990 deaths
People from Bar Harbor, Maine
Republican Party members of the Maine House of Representatives
Speakers of the Maine House of Representatives
Secretaries of State of Maine
20th-century American politicians